William Henry Lynn (August 22, 1921 – April 30, 2000) was an American Negro league pitcher in the 1940s.

A native of Cleveland County, North Carolina, Lynn attended North Carolina A&T State University and played for the Homestead Grays in 1943. He died in Bronx, New York in 2000 at age 78.

References

External links
 and Seamheads

1921 births
2000 deaths
Homestead Grays players
Baseball pitchers
Baseball players from North Carolina
People from Cleveland County, North Carolina
20th-century African-American sportspeople